John Wesley (August 3, 1947 – September 7, 2019) was an American actor who worked in many television series, including The Fresh Prince of Bel Air, and in Superhuman Samurai Syber-Squad, where he played the role of Principal Pratchert. He also had roles in many feature films as well as theater productions.

He was Mr. Jim on the series Martin for 3 seasons, and was the series regular "Sweets Walker" on Dirty Dancing, the television series. He has also appeared in numerous commercials and voiceovers including "Rafaki". His first main film role was as Frankie in Missing in Action 2: The Beginning starring Chuck Norris but his first credited film role was in the 1968 Clint Eastwood western Hang 'Em High. Wesley was also an award-winning stage actor and a Vietnam veteran.

Wesley earned degrees from the University of California, San Diego graduate acting program and the University of San Diego.

Wesley died on September 7, 2019, from complications of multiple myeloma, five weeks after his 72nd birthday.

Filmography

References

External links

1947 births
2019 deaths
20th-century American male actors
21st-century American male actors
Deaths from multiple myeloma
Place of death missing
People from Lake Charles, Louisiana
Military personnel from Louisiana
American male television actors
African-American male actors
Male actors from Louisiana
20th-century African-American people
21st-century African-American people